Lúcia Machado de Almeida (1910 – April 30, 2005) was a Brazilian writer. She was born in the Nova Granja farm, in São José da Lapa city, state of Minas Gerais. She moved to Belo Horizonte when she was a child. After that, she studied until High School at the Santa Maria school, in the same city. She learnt English, French, history of arts and music.

She had three siblings: Aníbal Machado, Paulo Machado and Carolina Machado, all of whom are writers. Her husband is the brother of another writer, the poet Guilherme de Almeida.

Her first published writing was a poem, "Desencanto", which appeared in the Estado de Minas newspaper when she was fourteen years old. Some year later, she published her first book called Estórias do Fundo do Mar. She won a number of literary prizes such as the Othon Bezerra de Mello Prize and the Stella della Solidarietá Medal.

Bibliography 

 Estórias do Fundo do Mar (Stories from Under the Sea)
 Lendas da Terra do Ouro (Myths of the Land of Gold)
 O Caso da Borboleta Atíria, novel (The Case of the Atiria Butterfly)
 O Escaravelho do Diabo, novel (The Devil's Scarab)
 Passeio a Sabará (Going for a Walk in Sabará)
 Passeio a Diamantina (Going for a walk in Diamantina)
 Xisto no Espaço, novel (Xisto in Space)
 Xisto e o Saca-Rolha, novel (Xisto and the Corkscrew)
 Aventuras de Xisto, novel (Xisto's Adventures)
 Passeio a Ouro Preto, novel (Going for a Walk in Ouro Preto)
 Passeio ao Alto Minho, novel(Going for a Walk in Alto Minho)
 Spharion, novel (Spharion)

References 

1910 births
2005 deaths
20th-century Brazilian novelists
20th-century Brazilian women writers
Brazilian women novelists